Courances is a commune in the Essonne department in Île-de-France in northern France.

Inhabitants of Courances are known as Courançois.

See also
Château de Courances
Communes of the Essonne department

References

External links

Mayors of Essonne Association 

Communes of Essonne